Franco Nicolás Pizzichillo Fernández (born 3 January 1996) is a Uruguayan professional footballer who plays as a right-back for Montevideo City Torque.

Club career
Pizzichillo is a youth academy product of Defensor Sporting. He joined Villa Teresa on loan during 2017 Segunda División season and made his senior debut on 2 September 2017 in a 5–1 win against Central Español. He scored his first goal on 10 September 2017 in a 3–2 loss against Tacuarembó.

International career
Pizzichillo is a former Uruguay youth international. He was part of Uruguay squad at 2013 South American U-17 Championship, 2013 FIFA U-17 World Cup and 2015 South American U-20 Championship.

On 5 March 2021, Pizzichillo was named in Uruguay senior team's 35-man preliminary squad for 2022 FIFA World Cup qualifying matches against Argentina and Bolivia. However, CONMEBOL suspended those matches next day amid concern over the COVID-19 pandemic.

Honours
Individual
 Uruguayan Primera División Team of the Year: 2020

References

External links
 

1996 births
Living people
Uruguayan people of Italian descent
Association football midfielders
Uruguayan footballers
Uruguayan Primera División players
Uruguayan Segunda División players
Villa Teresa players
Sportivo Cerrito players
Montevideo City Torque players